Aleksandr Akhyun (born 24 June 1892, date of death unknown) was a Russian gymnast. He competed in the men's artistic individual all-around event at the 1912 Summer Olympics.

References

1892 births
Year of death missing
Russian male artistic gymnasts
Olympic gymnasts of Russia
Gymnasts at the 1912 Summer Olympics